Ceratrichia is a genus of skipper butterflies in the family Hesperiidae. They are found in the
Afrotropical realm.

Species
Ceratrichia brunnea Bethune-Baker, 1906
Ceratrichia clara Riley, 1925
Ceratrichia crowleyi Riley, 1925
Ceratrichia flandria Evans, 1956
Ceratrichia flava Hewitson, 1878
Ceratrichia hollandi Bethune-Baker, 1908
Ceratrichia lewisi Collins & Larsen, 2000
Ceratrichia nothus (Fabricius, 1787)
Ceratrichia phocion (Fabricius, 1781)
Ceratrichia punctata Holland, 1896
Ceratrichia semlikensis Joicey & Talbot, 1921
Ceratrichia weberi Miller, 1964
Ceratrichia wollastoni Heron, 1909

Former species
Ceratrichia argyrosticta Plötz, 1879 - transferred to Argemma argyrosticta (Plötz, 1879)
Ceratrichia aurea Druce, 1910 - transferred to Argemma aurea (Druce, 1910)
Ceratrichia bonga Evans, 1946 - transferred to Argemma bonga (Evans, 1946)
Ceratrichia mabirensis Riley, 1925 - transferred to Argemma mabirensis (Riley, 1925)
Ceratrichia maesseni Miller, 1971 - transferred to Argemma maesseni (Miller, 1971)
Ceratrichia semilutea Mabille, 1891 - transferred to Ceratricula semilutea (Mabille, 1891)
Ceratrichia stellata Mabille, 1891 - transferred to Dotta stellata (Mabille, 1891)

References

External links
Natural History Museum Lepidoptera genus database
Seitz, A. Die Gross-Schmetterlinge der Erde 13: Die Afrikanischen Tagfalter. Plate XIII 79

Hesperiinae
Hesperiidae genera